Gideão Lima de Castro (born 19 December 1987), simply known as Gideão is a Brazilian professional footballer playing as a goalkeeper for Parnahyba Sport Club.

References

External links

1987 births
Living people
Association football goalkeepers
Brazilian footballers
Brazilian expatriate footballers
Rio Branco Atlético Clube players
Clube Náutico Capibaribe players
Moreirense F.C. players
Boavista F.C. players
Tupi Football Club players
Associação Atlética de Altos players
Salgueiro Atlético Clube players
Agremiação Sportiva Arapiraquense players
Campeonato Brasileiro Série A players
Campeonato Brasileiro Série B players
Campeonato Brasileiro Série D players
Primeira Liga players
Expatriate footballers in Portugal
Brazilian expatriate sportspeople in Portugal